The 2019 D1 Grand Prix series is the nineteenth season for the D1 Grand Prix series. The season began on June 29 at Tsukuba Circuit, and ended on November 3 at Autopolis.

Teams and drivers

Schedule

Drivers' rankings

D1GP

References

External links
  

D1 Grand Prix seasons
D1 Grand Prix